Toni Scullion is a Scottish computer science teacher who founded the charity dressCode, which aims to  advance computing science in schools, with a particular focus on closing the gender gap. She also co-founded the Ada Scotland Festival, which "brings together partners involved in addressing the issue of gender balance in computing science education in Scotland."

She has taught computing science at St Kentigern's Academy in Blackburn, West Lothian. She has received a number of accolades recognising her work to advance Computing Science and to improve diversity, including being nominated for a secondary teacher of the year at the Scotland Women in Technology awards three times, of which she has won twice  and her charity dressCode has received multiple awards

Talks 
Scullion has been a speaker at many events talking about her work with dressCode and closing the gender gap in computing science.

EduTech conference, 2019
MBN Solutions, "If they can't see it, they won’t be it" 
Cyber Scotland connect, volume 5
Edinburgh's Women in Tech conference 
PWC TechSheCan charter Scottish launch 
Hoppers International Women's day conference, 2020 
Institution of Engineering and Technology
West Lothian College, Interrupt19 Festival

Awards 
Scullion has won a variety of accolades for her work in furthering women in technology throughout her career.

Champion of Champions at the Scottish Cyber Awards 2017.
Secondary teacher of the year at the Scottish Women in Tech Awards 2018
Cyber Security Teacher of the Year at the Scottish Cyber Awards 2019.
 Secondary Teacher of the Year at the Scottish Women in Tech Awards 2019.
 Highly Acclaimed Security Serious Unsung Heroes awards 2019
Gender Diversity Champion of the Year at the Scottish Women in Tech Awards 2019.
Secondary Teacher of the Year at the Scottish Women in Tech Awards 2019.
Women in Tech Employer awards - Best Mentor 2020
Women in Tech Excellence awards - Team Leader of the Year 2020
Women in Tech Excellence awards - Hero of the Year 2020
Security Serious - Best Educator Award 2020

Recognition 
Scullion work in advancing computing science at schools and furthering women in technology has been recognised on a number of platforms.

Helped support USW efforts with the new degree to attract more female students (page 116)
Recognised in Edtech50 magazine
Motion in Scottish Parliament congratulating her on success at Cyber Security awards
Motion in Scottish Parliament commending her on launching her charity dressCode
Motion in Scottish Parliament congratulating her on success at Scotland Women in Technology awards
UN #sheinnovates campaign
Featured in project with Edinburgh University to help encourage more people to consider being a Computing Science teacher
Recognised in recommendations of Scottish Governments Scottish technology ecosystem: review
SC Magazine, Women of influence: 30 top cybersecurity leaders 2021

References

External links 

 dressCode official website
 
 Q&A with Toni Scullion, Founder @ dressCode, womenintechscotland.com
 Interrupt 19: Lightning Talks (Toni Scullion and Ronnie Corse) West Lothian College, Oct 24, 2019
Speaker at Edinburgh's Women in Tech conference

Year of birth missing (living people)
Living people
Scottish scientists
Scottish women scientists
Scottish women educators
Place of birth missing (living people)
British women computer scientists
Computer science education in the United Kingdom
Scottish schoolteachers